The 2006 Toray Pan Pacific Open was a women's tennis tournament played on indoor carpet courts. It was the 23rd edition of the Toray Pan Pacific Open, and was part of the Tier I Series of the 2006 WTA Tour. It took place at the Tokyo Metropolitan Gymnasium in Tokyo, Japan, from January 27 through February 5, 2006. Elena Dementieva won the singles title.

Champions

Singles

 Elena Dementieva defeated  Martina Hingis, 6–2, 6–0

Doubles

 Lisa Raymond /  Samantha Stosur  defeated  Cara Black /   Rennae Stubbs, 6–2, 6–1

External links
Official website
Singles, Doubles and Qualifying Singles draws

Toray Pan Pacific Open
Pan Pacific Open
Toray Pan Pacific Open
Toray Pan Pacific Open
Toray Pan Pacific Open
Toray Pan Pacific Open